Epicrates crassus is a species of snake in the family Boidae. The species is found in Argentina, Brazil, and Paraguay.

References 

Epicrates
Reptiles of Argentina
Reptiles of Brazil
Reptiles of Paraguay
Reptiles described in 1862
Taxa named by Edward Drinker Cope